The IDF Caterpillar D9 —nicknamed Doobi (for teddy bear) — is a Caterpillar D9 armored bulldozer used by the Israel Defense Forces (IDF). The Israeli armored CAT D9 was heavily modified by the Israel Defense Forces, Israeli Military Industries and Israel Aerospace Industries to increase the survivability of the bulldozer in hostile environments and enable it to withstand heavy attacks, thus making it suitable for military combat engineering use. The IDF Caterpillar D9 is operated by the Israel Defense Forces (IDF) Combat Engineering Corps for combat engineering and counter-terrorism operations.

Characteristics

Older generations, such as D9L and D9N are still in service, mainly in the reserve forces. The D9 has a crew of two: operator and commander. It is operated by the TZAMA (In  = ציוד מכני הנדסי, mechanical engineering equipment) units of the Combat Engineering Corps.

The main IDF modification is the installation of an Israeli-made vehicle armor kit which provides armor protection to the mechanical systems and to the operator cabin. The operator and commander are protected inside an armored cabin ("the cockpit"), with bulletproof glass windows to protect against bombs, machine guns, and sniper fire. The IDF also developed and installed slat armor add-on to deflect rocket-propelled grenade (RPG) rounds. The modified D9 bulldozers can be fitted with disparate features, such as crew-operated machine guns, smoke projectors, or grenade launchers. The Israeli armor and durable construction of the D9 makes it impervious to landmines, IED and large belly charges.

The IDF uses the D9 for a wide variety of combat engineering tasks, such as earthworks, digging moats, mounting sand barriers, building fortifications, rescuing stuck, overturned or damaged armored fighting vehicles (along with the M88 Recovery Vehicle), clearing land mines, detonating IEDs and explosives, handling booby traps, clearing terrain obstacles and opening routes to armored fighting vehicles and infantry, as well as structures demolition, including under fire.

History

The Caterpillar D9 bulldozer was introduced in 1954 by Caterpillar Inc. and quickly found its way to civilian engineering in Israel and from there it was recruited to military service by the Israel Defense Forces (IDF).

Earlier use 
Unarmored D9 bulldozers took part in the Sinai War (1956), Six-Day War (1967), Yom Kippur War (1973) and Operation Peace for Galilee (1982).

During Yom Kippur War D9 bulldozers opened routes to Israeli forces, clearing landmines and other anti-tank obstacles. In the southern front, D9s towed bridges and breaching equipment and helped General Ariel Sharon to cross the Suez Canal and determine the war with Egypt. The D9s razed the sand barrier around the canal and cleared mines near it. In the northern front, the D9 was the first motorized vehicle to reach the summit of Mount Hermon as it paved the way for IDF Engineering Corps, Golani Brigade and Paratroopers Brigade to claim the summit and prevent it from falling into the hands of Syria.

During Operation Peace for Galilee D9s were employed in breaching and paving ways through mountains and fields in the mountain landscape of southern Lebanon. The D9s also cleared minefields and explosive belly charges set on the main routes by Syrian army and Palestinian insurgents. Because the D9 served as front-line tools, the IDF developed armor kits to protect the lives of the soldiers operating them.

Between the wars, D9 bulldozers were employed in earthworks, fortifications buildings, opening routes and clearing explosive charges. During the late 1980s Israeli-made armor was installed on the D9L bulldozers that were in IDF service. Improved armor kits were designed and installed on the D9N bulldozers during the 1990s.

The Second Intifada 

Therefore, they were used to open safe routes to IDF forces and detonate explosive charges planted by Palestinian militants. The bulldozers were used extensively to clear shrubbery and structures which were used as cover for Palestinian attacks. In addition they razed houses of families of suicide bombers.

Following several incidents where armed Palestinians barricaded themselves inside houses and killed soldiers attempting to breach the entries, the IDF developed "Nohal Sir Lachatz" (נוהל סיר לחץ "pressure cooker procedure") in which D9s and other engineering vehicles were used to bring them out by razing the houses; most of them surrendered because of fear of being buried alive.

During the Battle of Jenin 2002 armored D9 bulldozers cleared booby traps and improvised explosive devices, and eventually razed houses from which militants fired upon Israeli soldiers or contained possible IEDs and booby traps. A translated interview with one of the drivers was published by Gush Shalom. After the deadly ambush in which 13 soldiers were killed, D9 bulldozers razed the center of the camp and forced the remaining Palestinian fighters to surrender, thus finishing the battle with an Israeli victory.

In Rafah and near the Philadelphi Route the D9s razed thousands of buildings according to human rights reports; Israel claimed it is a security measure necessary to discover and destroy smuggling tunnels and destroy firing positions that threaten the forces in the area, while Palestinians claimed it was to create a "buffer zone" and punish Palestinians for IDF casualties.

While Palestinians saw the D9 as a devastating weapon, and human rights groups criticized it for the massive damage it caused to Palestinian infrastructure, Israelis and military experts saw the D9 as a necessary tool for combating insurgency and terrorism and a key factor in reducing IDF casualties.

D9R and early 21st century 

During the early 2000s, the new D9R entered IDF service, equipped with a new generation armor designed by the IDF's MASHA (lit. Restoration and Maintenance Center), Israel Aerospace Industries and Zoko Shiloovim/ITE (Caterpillar Inc. importers in Israel). Due to the increasing threat of shaped charge anti-tank rockets and anti-tank missile, the IDF introduced in 2005 a slat armor, installed in large numbers on the IDF D9R dozers in 2006. The slat armor proved to be effective and life-saving; its developers and installers won the IDF's Ground Command award.

The IDF also operates armored remote-controlled D9N bulldozers, called "Raam HaShachar" (lit. "thunder of dawn") often incorrectly referred as "black thunder". The remote-controlled bulldozer is used when there is a great risk for human life, mainly when opening dangerous routes and detonating explosive charges.

Armored D9R bulldozers and unmanned "Raam HaShachar" D9N bulldozers played important role in the Second Lebanon War (2006) and Operation Cast Lead (2008–2009). Both bulldozer types were involved in opening routes, clearing explosives and IEDs, building sand mounds to protect AFVs and infantry camps, and demolishing structures such as rigged buildings, HQs, warehouses, outposts, bunkers and tunnels – often concealed in civilian structures. In total, 100 D9s were deployed during Operation Cast Lead.

Armored D9R bulldozers took part in the effort to extinguish 2010 Mount Carmel forest fire. The armored bulldozers opened routes to fire trucks and fire fighters into the heart of the fire. They also created fire breaks by clearing shrubbery and pushing up soil barriers in order to prevent the fire from spreading. They also helped extinguish fires by burying them in dirt and soil.

In 2014 the IDF Caterpillar D9 was recorded in Guinness World Records as the most armored bulldozer in the world.

In 2019, Elbit Systems won an IMOD contract to install the Iron Fist active protection system on the IDF's armored D9 bulldozers, to give them extra protection from anti-tank missiles.

Operation Protective Edge 

IDF D9 armored bulldozers took major role in Operation Protective Edge (2014), both in defensive missions and offensive maneuvers. The D9s assisted other heavy equipment such as excavators and drillers in exposing and destroying cross-border underground tunnels penetrating into Israel, more than 30 of these tunnels were destroyed during the operation. The reserve mechanical engineering equipment (צמ"ה) and bulldozers battalion of the Central Command received a citation of recommendation  (צל"ש, tzalash) from the Chief of Staff of the Israel Defense Forces.

In the first day of the operation, an IDF D9 bulldozer foiled a penetration terror attack in the beach of Zikim, killing two terrorists. Two others were killed by IDF patrol boat.

The D9s also participated in the ground offensive, opening routes to tanks and infantry forces, and demolishing structures that were used by Palestinian militants. On July 27, one D9 was hit by an anti-tank missile, killing its operator and wounding its commander. Another D9 demolished the building from which the missile was launched, killing 8 militants and capturing two more. The crew received a citation of recommendation (צל"ש, tzalash) for their action.

D9T Panda 

In 2018 the Israel Defense Forces Combat Engineering Corps started to deploy and operate the "Panda" – a remote-controlled version of an armored Caterpillar D9T bulldozer. In 2018, Israel Aerospace Industries announced that it had signed a contract to equip the IDF with more D9T Panda dozers.

Models in IDF service

See also
House demolition in the Israeli–Palestinian conflict
 Armored bulldozer
Mahmoud Tawalbe, head of the Palestinian Islamic Jihad, killed in the Battle of Jenin (2002) by an IDF D9	
 Rachel Corrie, an ISM activist killed by an IDF D9 while acting as a human shield

References

 

Citations

External links

Caterpillar D-Series Track-Type Tractors – Official Caterpillar website
Armoured D9R Dozer (of the IDF) – review im Army-Technology
D9  in Israel's Combat Engineering Corps website (Hebrew)
Photos of the IDF Caterpillar D9, Flickr
IDF Caterpillar D9 – vocal version of this article, YouTube
The Israel Defense Forces operate the most heavily armored bulldozer in the world, We Are The Mighty, October 2022

D9
D9
D9
Caterpillar Inc. vehicles